A double majority is a voting system which requires a majority of votes according to two separate criteria.  The mechanism is usually used to require strong support for any measure considered to be of great importance. Typically in legislative bodies, a double majority requirement exists in the form of a quorum being necessary for legislation to be passed.

Examples in use

Australia
In Australia, constitutional changes must be passed at a referendum in a majority of states (4 of the 6), and by a majority of voters nationally.  Prior to 1977, the votes of citizens in the Northern Territory and the ACT did not affect the national or state-based count.  After a Constitution Alteration put to referendum in 1977 and given vice-regal assent on 19 July 1977, Territorial votes contribute towards the national majority, but the Territories themselves do not count towards the majority of states.

Canada
Since the patriation of the Canadian constitution in 1982, thorough amending formulae for the constitution were adopted.  Per the Constitution Act, 1982, many amendments can be passed only by the Parliament of Canada and a two-thirds majority of the provincial legislatures, those provinces together representing at least 50% of the national population-–this is known as the 7/50 formula (as there were and are 10 provinces, so 7 constitutes a two-thirds majority). Additionally, a province can explicitly choose to dissent to an amendment that "derogates from the legislative powers, the proprietary rights or any other rights or privileges of the legislature or government of a province", in which case it does not apply in that province even if passed. Though not constitutionally mandated, a referendum is also considered to be necessary by some, especially following the precedent established by the Charlottetown Accord in 1992.

However, there are some parts of the constitution that can be modified only by a vote of all the provinces plus the Parliament of Canada; these include changes to the composition of the Supreme Court of Canada, changing the process for amending the constitution itself, or any act affecting the Canadian monarch or Governor General.

European Union
In the European Union, double majority voting replaced artificial voting weights for votes requiring a qualified majority in the Council of the European Union following implementation of the Treaty of Lisbon. A qualified majority requires 55% of voting EU member states, representing at least 65% of the population of voting members for a European Commission proposal to be approved. This increases to 72% of voting members states, representing at least 65% of the EU population of voting members should the proposal originate from a member state. Proposals can be blocked should a qualified majority of least four Council members representing more than 35% of the EU population be formed.

Finland 
Changing the constitution of Finland requires that a simple majority of the sitting Parliament vote in favor of the amendment. The amendment is postponed until the next general election. The next parliament may finally vote to ratify the amendment but by a two thirds of the MPs. Thus, a double majority of two different parliaments is usually required to pass constitutional amendments. An expedited process may however be entered if five sixths of the sitting parliament vote to declare an amendment urgent. Then, a two-thirds majority of the current parliament may ratify an amendment using the expedited process.

Montenegro 
When Montenegro voted for independence from Serbia, the EU insisted on a supermajority of 55% for it to recognise the result; this supermajority was akin to a double majority, and would avoid the endless debate that could have resulted if the result had a smaller majority.

Northern Ireland 
Under the terms of the Belfast Agreement, if 30 members or more request it, a measure may be put to a "cross-community vote" which requires a majority from both the Nationalist and Unionist camps.

Romania
In Romania, a national referendum is considered valid only if at least 50% plus one of the registered voters cast their ballot. For a valid referendum, the outcome is determined by a simple majority of valid votes cast. The whole process thus involves a double majority in form of a quorum.

A controversial amendment to the referendum law arose during the 2012 political crisis and allowed for an exception to be made in case of a referendum regarding the impeachment of the President. The original law, which required a double majority for impeachment, was modified by governmental emergency decree to circumvent the quorum requirement. This would have resulted in a successful impeachment of the President in the following referendum. The referendum was, however, subsequently invalidated by the Constitutional Court, the body responsible for overseeing the whole process, putting an end to the crisis.

Sudan 
The independence referendum for South Sudan required 51% of the vote and 60% turnout.

Switzerland 
In Switzerland, the passing of a constitutional amendment by popular vote requires a double majority; not only must a majority of people vote for the amendment but a majority of cantons must also give their consent. This is to prevent a larger canton from foisting amendments onto the smaller ones and vice versa.

United States
Double majority is used in the United States for some initiative or referendum votes on issues such as a tax levy or bond. Essentially, a double majority standard applies a two-part test to a vote outcome before a measure is passed:
 Did a majority of registered voters turn out for the election?
 Did votes in favor outnumber votes against, by the required margin?
If the answer to either of these questions is No, the measure fails.

This mechanism is used to prevent a small group from passing spending measures that affect the entire population in order to support their pet causes, especially at an election expected to have low voter turnout. Double majorities are also frequently used in municipal annexations, wherein majorities of both the residents in the annexing territory and the territory to be annexed must support the annexation. A similar rule exists for adopting metropolitan government in Tennessee, where the referendum must pass both inside and outside the principal city.

Notes

References

 Butterworths Concise Australian Legal Dictionary, 2nd edition (2002).  
Europa Glossary

Voting theory
Legal terminology
European Union legislative procedure
Australian constitutional law
Majority